The Molmys is a river in Perm Krai, Russia, a left tributary of the Yazva. It starts on the southeastern slope of Mount Vogulsky Kamen, in the middle part of the Kvarkush mountain range. It flows through the southeastern portion of Krasnovishersky District, its mouth located upstream of the settlement Krasny Bereg. There are many rapids throughout the river, and the bottom is rocky.

Main tributaries:
 Left: Burnima, Bolshaya Kyzya, Bolshaya Ursa;
 Right: Grebeshkova, Bolshaya Munya, Bystraya.

References

Rivers of Perm Krai